This is a list of Scottish League Cup winning football managers.  The Scottish League Cup is a knockout cup competition in Scottish football, organised by the Scottish Professional Football League (SPFL). It is considered to be the second most important domestic cup competition in Scottish football, after the Scottish Cup. The competition is open to all 42 members of the SPFL, as well as invited sides from the Highland League and Lowland League.

The competition was established in 1947, under a format used by the Southern League Cup which operated as a regional tournament (national for its last season) during World War II. The Scottish League Cup was formed, operated by and named after the Scottish Football League (SFL), who continued to operate it after the top division clubs formed the Scottish Premier League (SPL) in 1998. The competition is now organised by the SPFL, the body formed by the merger of the SPL and SFL in 2013.

Bill Struth, with Rangers in 1946–47, was the first team manager to win the competition. This list gives details of the winning club and their manager in each season since then. Scot Symon, Jock Stein and Walter Smith are the most successful managers in the history of the competition, having each won 6 Scottish League Cups during their careers.

Winning managers

By individual

By nationality

See also
 List of Scottish Cup winning managers
 List of Scottish League Cup finals

Notes

References

External links
 Scotland - List of League Cup Finals

Managers
League Cup winning managers